Julien Andlauer (born 5 July 1999 in Lyon) is a racing driver from France. He is a Porsche contracted driver who competes in a range of championships having won both French and German Carrera Cup Championships. He currently competes in the ADAC GT Masters.

Racing record

Career summary

† Guest driver ineligible to score points

Complete French F4 Championship results 
(key) (Races in bold indicate pole position) (Races in italics indicate fastest lap)

Complete FIA World Endurance Championship results
(key) (Races in bold indicate pole position; races in italics indicate fastest lap)

* Season still in progress.

Complete 24 Hours of Le Mans results

Complete WeatherTech SportsCar Championship results
(key) (Races in bold indicate pole position; results in italics indicate fastest lap)

References

External links

 Profile at Driver Database

1999 births
Living people
French racing drivers
Sportspeople from Lyon
Porsche Supercup drivers
24H Series drivers
FIA World Endurance Championship drivers
24 Hours of Le Mans drivers
ADAC GT Masters drivers
Asian Le Mans Series drivers
French F4 Championship drivers
Nürburgring 24 Hours drivers
WeatherTech SportsCar Championship drivers
Auto Sport Academy drivers
Walter Lechner Racing drivers
Rowe Racing drivers
Porsche Motorsports drivers
Saintéloc Racing drivers
Le Mans Cup drivers
Toksport WRT drivers
Porsche Carrera Cup Germany drivers